Vetula means "old woman" in Latin and may refer to:

 Vetula, a 7th-century name for corn dolly, a form of straw work

See also
Ortalis vetula, a species of bird
Saurothera vetula, a species of cuckoo
Balistes vetula, a species of  triggerfish
Muscipipra vetula, a species of bird